This is a list of electoral division results for the Australian 2004 federal election for the Australian Capital Territory and the Northern Territory.

Australian Capital Territory

Canberra

Fraser

Northern Territory

Lingiari

Solomon

See also 
 Members of the Australian House of Representatives, 2004–2007

References 

Territories 2004